Salem Evangelical Lutheran Church, also known as Old Salem Lutheran Church, is a historic Evangelical Lutheran church located in Lebanon, Lebanon County, Pennsylvania. The property includes two contributing buildings: the 18th century Old Salem church and the 19th century Salem Memorial Chapel.  The Old Salem church was built between 1796 and 1798, and is a two-story, rectangular limestone building.  It was modified in 1848, to infill corners and add the second story.  The Salem Memorial Chapel was built in 1898, and is a limestone and sandstone building in a Gothic style with Richardsonian Romanesque influences. It was renovated in 1928. A 10-foot tall obelisk is also erected on the property.

It was added to the National Register of Historic Places in 2010.

References

External links
Salem Evangelical Lutheran Church website

Churches on the National Register of Historic Places in Pennsylvania
Gothic Revival church buildings in Pennsylvania
Churches completed in 1798
18th-century Lutheran churches in the United States
Churches in Lebanon County, Pennsylvania
National Register of Historic Places in Lebanon County, Pennsylvania